Monkey Puzzle (in the United States of America, Where's My Mom?), written by Julia Donaldson and illustrated by Axel Scheffler, is an illustrated children's story book, published in 2000 by Alison Green Books. Donaldson dedicated the book to her cousin's children, Tom, Billy, Emma and Katie.

Plot

The story revolves around a child-like monkey who has lost her mother in the deep, thick, hot jungle. The monkey is then assisted to find her mother by a butterfly, who tries to think of whereabouts in the jungle she might be. However, the butterfly keeps suggesting incorrect animals as the monkey's mother, including an elephant, a snake, a spider, a parrot, a frog and a bat. Eventually, the butterfly and the monkey find the monkey's Dad, who says, "Come, little monkey, come, come, come, it's time I took you home to..." and then shortly after another call, Butterfly finds the monkey's lost mother and the monkey is happy again, as well as the butterfly.

British picture books
Children's fiction books
2000 children's books
Donaldson and Scheffler
Primates in popular culture